Lova may refer to:
 868 Lova, a main-belt asteroid
 Chevrolet Lova (disambiguation), subcompact automobiles
 Lova Adrien Marie Rakotoniaina, a Malagasy politician
 Lova Boy,  a recording artist and entrepreneur from Belize
 Lova Lova an album from the French pop group Superbus
 Lova Lundin (born 29 October 1998) is a Swedish footballer
 Lova Moor (Marie-Claude Jourdain; born 1946), a French dancer and singer
 Lova Ladiva, French drag queen

See also
 Lovas (disambiguation)
 Ole Ivar Lovaas (1927-2010), Norwegian-American clinical psychologist